Mount Fricaba is a  double summit mountain located in the Olympic Mountains, in Jefferson County of Washington state. It is situated on the shared border of Olympic National Park with Buckhorn Wilderness, and is the highest point in that wilderness, as well as the Olympic National Forest. Its nearest higher peak is Hal Foss Peak,  to the southwest. Precipitation runoff from the peak drains east into headwaters of the Dungeness River, or west into Deception Creek which is a tributary of the Dosewallips River. The mountain's name was officially adopted in 1961 by the United States Board on Geographic Names based on usage by The Mountaineers since 1907, and inclusion in Fred Beckey's "Climber's Guide to the Cascade and Olympic Mountains of Washington" published in 1949. The first ascent of the mountain was made in 1957 by Don Bechlem and Jack Newman.

Climate

Mount Fricaba is located in the marine west coast climate zone of western North America. Most weather fronts originate in the Pacific Ocean, and travel northeast toward the Olympic Mountains. As fronts approach, they are forced upward by the peaks of the Olympic Range, causing them to drop their moisture in the form of rain or snowfall (Orographic lift). As a result, the Olympics experience high precipitation, especially during the winter months in the form of snowfall. During winter months, weather is usually cloudy, but, due to high pressure systems over the Pacific Ocean that intensify during summer months, there is often little or no cloud cover during the summer. The months July through September offer the most favorable weather for climbing Mount Fricaba.

Geology

The Olympic Mountains are composed of obducted clastic wedge material and oceanic crust, primarily Eocene sandstone, turbidite, and basaltic oceanic crust. The mountains were sculpted during the Pleistocene era by erosion and glaciers advancing and retreating multiple times.

Gallery

See also

 Olympic Mountains
 Geology of the Pacific Northwest
 Geography of Washington (state)

References

External links
 Weather: Mount Fricaba

Mountains of Washington (state)
Mountains of Jefferson County, Washington
Olympic Mountains
Landforms of Olympic National Park
North American 2000 m summits